Loch Fyne Oysters is a seafood and meat company that operates on the banks of Loch Fyne, Scotland. The company created the Loch Fyne Restaurants chain, which was later sold to Greene King. Loch Fyne Oysters still owns the Loch Fyne brand and supplies its products to the restaurant chain.

History
The company takes its name from Loch Fyne, a sea loch on the west coast of Scotland. The business started life in 1979 as an oyster farm in that loch. It was originally a joint venture by Johnny Noble, the owner of the nearby Ardkinglas Estate, and Andy Lane, a fish farmer and biologist. Initially the business sold their oysters to UK restaurants. In the early 1980s the company diversified into the supply of other seafood, and opened a smokehouse to smoke salmon and other fish.

In 1988 the Loch Fyne Oyster Bar was opened adjacent to the A83 road on the banks of the loch at Clachan, on the other side of the head of the loch from Cairndow. The first Loch Fyne Oyster Bar away from the loch opened in Nottingham in 1990, followed by a second near Peterborough. Towards the end of the 1990s, the founders of the business began to look for partners to develop a larger restaurant chain and were joined by two entrepreneurs, Ian Glyn and Mark Derry. In 1998 the Loch Fyne Restaurant chain was founded, as a separately owned business using the Loch Fyne name under licence from Loch Fyne Oysters.

In 2002, Johnny Noble died and Loch Fyne Oysters was placed on the market. In 2003 it became an employee owned company, with its shares owned by 100 of its employees. Loch Fyne Oysters continues to run the Cairndow Oyster Bar, along with the oyster and mussel farms and smokehouses. It sells its product to the Loch Fyne Restaurant chain, to other restaurants, and over the internet.

As of 2007, the Loch Fyne Restaurant chain operated 38 restaurants across the UK. In August 2007, the restaurant chain (but not Loch Fyne Oysters) was bought by the Greene King Brewery for £68 million.

In 2012, the employee-owned company was taken over by Scottish Seafood Investments.

See also

 List of seafood restaurants

References

External links
 

Scottish brands
Restaurant groups in the United Kingdom
Oyster bars
Food and drink companies of Scotland
1979 establishments in Scotland
Employee-owned companies of the United Kingdom